Andrew Fuller was a Baptist minister.

Andrew Fuller may also refer to:

Drew Fuller (born 1980), American actor and former male model
Andy Fuller (born 1974), American football player

See also
Andrew Fuller Fox